Autódromo de Deodoro is a proposed motorsport circuit in Rio de Janeiro, Brazil. Still in the design phase, it will be built in the neighborhood of Deodoro, in substitution to the Autódromo Internacional Nelson Piquet, which in 2012 was decommissioned and demolished for works of the 2016 Summer Olympics.

The initial forecast was for construction to begin and end in 2012, however, in December 2011, the Legal Department of the Brazilian Confederation of Motor Vehicles (CBA) requested the challenge of the edict of construction of the Barra Olympic Park in the field of the Autodromo International Nelson Piquet, in Jacarepaguá. According to the entity, the use of the area for the construction was conditioned to the construction and delivery of a new autodrome of international standard. In January 2012, the court upheld the CBA's request and suspended the bidding process.

In May 2012, after a meeting in Brasília between CBA president Cleyton Pinteiro and representatives of the Federal Government, Rio de Janeiro State Government and City Hall, it was decided that the construction of the racetrack would begin in January 2013. In July, however, a security problem was raised. The location chosen (a military area that had not been used for a long time) could hide mines, grenades and bombs. So that the work could only begin after the completion of the investigations to the ground, proving the security of the place. In November, the Brazilian Ministry of Sports and the Brazilian Army announced the construction of the racetrack.

By February 2021, the project was cancelled because of the high concern of the environment in the Camboatá Forest, which led to the project only being restarted by early August the same year, maybe relocating the circuit to a different region

References 

Deodoro
Deodoro
Deodoro
Deodoro
Deodoro